Thomas Finney (born 6 November 1952 in Belfast) is a former Northern Ireland international footballer who made over 260 appearances in the Football League for Cambridge United as a midfielder. He was a member of the Northern Ireland squad at the 1982 World Cup.

International career 
Finney scored one goal in five appearances for the Northern Ireland amateur team between 1972 and 1973. He won 14 caps for the senior team between 1974 and 1980 and was a member of the Northern Ireland 1982 World Cup squad, but did not make an appearance.

Personal life 
While a junior player in Northern Ireland, Finney worked for a gas company.

Honours 
Luton Town

 Football League Second Division second-place promotion: 1973–74
Cambridge United
 Football League Third Division second-place promotion: 1977–78
 Football League Fourth Division: 1976–77

Individual

 Cambridge United Hall of Fame

Career statistics

References 

1952 births
Living people
Association footballers from Northern Ireland
Northern Ireland international footballers
1982 FIFA World Cup players
Linfield F.C. players
Lisburn Distillery F.C. players
Crusaders F.C. players
Luton Town F.C. players
Sunderland A.F.C. players
Cambridge United F.C. players
Brentford F.C. players
Cambridge City F.C. players
Northern Ireland amateur international footballers
Ely City F.C. players
Histon F.C. players
Histon F.C. managers
English Football League players
March Town United F.C. players
NIFL Premiership players
Football managers from Northern Ireland
Southern Football League players
Association football midfielders